Ali Al-Ahrach (born 5 July 1984) is a Moroccan equestrian.

Career highlights 
Al-Ahrach was a gold medalist in team showjumping at the 2019 African Games in Rabat.

He qualified to represent Morocco at the 2020 Summer Olympics, where he competed as in the individual jumping and team jumping events.

References

External links

 
 
 
 

1984 births
Living people
Moroccan male equestrians
Olympic equestrians of Morocco
Equestrians at the 2020 Summer Olympics
21st-century Moroccan people